Jabal Dakkā or "Mount Dhaka", is the highest mountain in the area of the town of Ash-Shafā, about  from the city of Taif, located in the western region of Saudi Arabia.

Height
To resolve the controversy a panel of religious scholars visited the mountain to observe sunset. The committee of legitimacy, including a member of the Supreme Council of Saudi Scholars Abdullah al-Mutlaq determined that the peak need not adhere to calendar.

Location
It overlooks the Shifa tourist center. The mountain is used to know the dates of prayer, fasting and breakfast in the month of Ramadan. The vegetation of the mountain is covered with juniper trees, the plant covers the bottom of the mountain and then gradually thins out until it reaches the top. The temperature of the top reaches below  in the winter.

Wildlife

Hamadryas baboons are present here.

References

External links
 Al Shafa (Lonely Planet)
 Al Shafa Taif KSA (YouTube)
 Taif Ash Shafa Trip 2016
 Jabal Dakka, Al Shafa, Taif
 4K Timelapse on Jabal Dakka in Al-Shafa, Taif

At-Ta'if
Daka